Heart's Desire may refer to:

Film and television
 Heart's Desire (1917 film), an American silent drama film
 Heart's Desire (1935 film), a British musical drama film
 Heart's Desire (1960 film), a Swedish comedy film
 "Heart's Desire" (The Outer Limits), a television episode

Music
 "Heart's Desire" (song), by Lee Roy Parnell, 1996
 "Heart's Desire", a song by Billy Joe Royal, 1966
 "Heart's Desire", a song by Don Blackman, 1982
 "Heart's Desire", a song by the Manhattan Transfer from The Manhattan Transfer, 1975
 "Heart's Desire", a song by Ron Sexsmith from Cobblestone Runway, 2002

Places
 Heart's Desire, Newfoundland and Labrador, Canada, a town
 Heart's Desire Formation, a geologic formation in Newfoundland, Canada

Other uses
 Heart's Desire (book), a 1988 essay collection by Edward Hoagland
 The Heart's Desire, a 2005 audio drama featuring the character Bernice Summerfield